Myiasis is a parasitic infestation caused by larvae of several fly species. Diagnosis and treatment are generally quite simple. This infestation is, however, rarely seen in the vulvar area. Infestation of vulvar area with larvae and maggots is called vulvar myiasis. Very few cases have been described in literature.

References

Further reading
  says "BACKGROUND: To report a rare case of vulvar myiasis caused by Wohlfartia magnifica, including clinical and microscopic observations. CASE: A vulvar lesion was found in a 31-year-old married female villager with the history of dropping fly larvae from vulva, vulvar pain and itching sensation. The larvae were identified as the species of Wohlfartia magnifica. The lesion was washed with batticon over a period of five days and the patient was discharged. CONCLUSION: Vulvar myiasis should be considered in the differential diagnosis of genital lesions. The diagnosis can be easily established based on microscopic features of the maggots, especially those relating to stigma structures."

External links
Diptera.info

Arthropod infestations